Frédéric Nihous (born 15 August 1967) is a French politician from the Hunting, Fishing, Nature, Traditions (CPNT) party.  He was a candidate for the 2007 French presidential election, but was eliminated in the first round of balloting. He was second to last, with 1.15% of votes (420 645 votes).

Born in Valenciennes, his origins are in Nord-Pas-de-Calais, in Northern France, but he lives in the Pyrénées Atlantiques, in south-western France.
He was the Secretary General for CPNT starting in 1999 in the European Parliament. In 2002 he was the director of the presidential campaign of Jean Saint-Josse (founder of CPNT). After the election he became the parliamentary assistant to Saint-Josse, and controlled the political direction of the party.

He is married and a father of two.

References 

  Frédéric Nihous' official campaign site for the 2007 presidential election
  Profile of Frédéric Nihous in Libération

1967 births
Living people
People from Valenciennes
Candidates in the 2007 French presidential election
French people of Polish descent
Hunting, Fishing, Nature and Traditions politicians